In trigonometry, the gradian, also known as the gon (from ), grad, or grade, is a unit of measurement of an angle, defined as one hundredth of the right angle; in other words, there are 100 gradians in 90 degrees. Measuring angles in gradians is said to employ the centesimal system of angular measurement, initiated as part of metrication and decimalisation efforts.

In continental Europe, the French word centigrade, also known as centesimal minute of arc, was in use for one hundredth of a grade; similarly, the centesimal second of arc was defined as one hundredth of a centesimal arc-minute, analogous to decimal time and the sexagesimal minutes and seconds of arc. The chance of confusion was one reason for the adoption of the term Celsius to replace centigrade as the name of the temperature scale.

Gradians are principally used in surveying (especially in Europe), 

and to a lesser extent in mining and geology.

 the gon is officially a legal unit of measurement in the European Union and in Switzerland.

The gradian is not part of the International System of Units (SI).

History and name
Due to confusion with the existing term grad(e) in some northern European countries (meaning a standard degree,  of a turn), the name gon was later adopted, first in those regions, and later as the international standard. In France, it was also called .

Although attempts at a general introduction were made, the unit was only adopted in some countries, and for specialised areas such as surveying, mining and geology. The French armed forces' artillery units have used the gon for decades. Today, the degree,  of a turn, or the mathematically more convenient radian,  of a turn (used in the SI system of units) is generally used instead.

In the 1990s, most scientific calculators offered the gon, as well as radians and degrees, for their trigonometric functions. In the 2010s, some scientific calculators lack support for gradians.

Symbol

The international standard symbol for this unit today is "gon" (see ISO 31-1). Other symbols used in the past include "gr", "grd", and "g", the last sometimes written as a superscript, similarly to a degree sign: 50g = 45°.
A metric prefix sometimes is used, as in "dgon", "cgon", "mgon", respectively, 0.1 gon, 0.01 gon, 0.001 gon.
Centesimal arc-minutes and centesimal arc-seconds were also denoted with superscripts c and cc, respectively.

Advantages and disadvantages

Each quadrant is assigned a range of 100 gon, which eases recognition of the four quadrants, as well as arithmetic involving perpendicular or opposite angles.
{|
|-
|align="right"|   0° ||align="center"| = ||align="right"|   0 gradians
|-
|align="right"|  90° ||align="center"| = ||align="right"| 100 gradians
|-
|align="right"| 180° ||align="center"| = ||align="right"| 200 gradians
|-
|align="right"| 270° ||align="center"| = ||align="right"| 300 gradians
|-
|align="right"| 360° ||align="center"| = ||align="right"| 400 gradians
|}

One advantage of this unit is that right angles to a given angle are easily determined. If one is sighting down a compass course of 117 gon, the direction to one's left is 17 gon, to one's right 217 gon, and behind one 317 gon. A disadvantage is that the common angles of 30° and 60° in geometry must be expressed in fractions (as  gon and  gon, respectively).

Similarly, in one hour ( day), Earth rotates by 15° or  gon (see also decimal time). These observations are a consequence of the fact that the number 360 has more divisors than the number 400 does; notably, 360 is divisible by 3, while 400 is not. There are twelve factors of 360 less than or equal to its square root: . However, there are only eight for 400: .

Conversion

Relation to the metre  

In the 18th century, the metre was defined as the 10-millionth part of a quarter meridian.
Thus, one gon corresponds to an arc length along the Earth's surface of approximately 100 kilometres; 1 centigon to 1 kilometre; 10 microgon to 1 metre.

Relation to the SI system of units  
The gradian is not part of the International System of Units (SI). The EU directive on the units of measurement notes that the gradian does not appear in the lists drawn up by the CGPM, CIPM or BIPM. The most recent, 9th edition of the SI Brochure does not mention the gradian at all. The previous edition mentioned it only in a footnote, which said the following:

See also 
 
  (primarily military use)
 
 
 
 
  (the "square radian")

Notes

References

External links
 Ask Dr Math
 Definitions of grade, gon and centigrade on sizes.com
Dictionary of Units

Units of plane angle
Decimalisation
Metrication
Non-SI metric units